Bernard Vera (born 5 March 1950 in Villefranche-de-Rouergue) is a former member of the Senate of France, representing the Essonne department. He is a member of the Communist, Republican, and Citizen Group.

External links
Page on the Senate website 

1950 births
Living people
French Communist Party members
French Senators of the Fifth Republic
People from Villefranche-de-Rouergue
Senators of Essonne